Oneida Baptist Institute (OBI) is a coeducational Southern Baptist boarding school in Oneida, Kentucky, affiliated with the Kentucky Baptist Convention.

History
Oneida Baptist Institute was founded by James Anderson Burns with the intent of bringing an end to the culture of feuds and violence in Clay County, Kentucky.  Burns aimed "to teach the children of the hostile clans to love each other and not fight," believing that a combination of education and Christian love would cause their feuds to "stop automatically." With the help of H. L. McMurray, a Baptist preacher originally from Kansas, Burns selected a site for the school and recruited members of the warring clans to work together to build it. The founder was correct and the collaborative efforts of many in starting the school put an end to the feuding in the area.

The first building was completed in 1899 and classes began on January 1, 1900, with four teachers and 125 students.

The current president is Caleb Jermiah Monday, who has been president since mid 2013.

Notable alumni

References

External links
 

Baptist Christianity in Kentucky
Boarding schools in Kentucky
Educational institutions established in 1899
Private high schools in Kentucky
Schools in Clay County, Kentucky
Settlement schools
1899 establishments in Kentucky
Christian schools in Kentucky